William Henry Baylis (born April 15, 1962 in San Francisco, California) is an American former competitive sailor and Olympic silver medalist. At the 1988 Summer Olympics, Baylis finished in 2nd place in the soling class along with his partners John Kostecki and Robert Billingham.

References

External links
 
 
 

Living people
1962 births
American male sailors (sport)
Australian Champions Soling
Medalists at the 1988 Summer Olympics
North American Champions Soling
Olympic silver medalists for the United States in sailing
Sailors at the 1988 Summer Olympics – Soling
Soling class world champions